Nicole Bourdiau (born 2 June 1948) is a French gymnast. She competed in six events at the 1968 Summer Olympics.

References

1948 births
Living people
French female artistic gymnasts
Olympic gymnasts of France
Gymnasts at the 1968 Summer Olympics
Sportspeople from Saône-et-Loire
20th-century French women